Wessel Myburgh (born 31 May 1990) is a Namibian cricketer. He is a right-handed batsman and wicket-keeper. He was born in Windhoek.

Myburgh made his List A debut for the side during the 2009-10 season, against Griqualand West. From the tailend, he scored 5 runs. Myburgh's first-class debut came the following month, in the ICC Intercontinental Shield, against the United Arab Emirates.

In October 2018, he was named in Namibia's squad in the Southern sub region group for the 2018–19 ICC World Twenty20 Africa Qualifier tournament in Botswana.

References

External links
Wessel Myburgh at Cricket Archive 

1990 births
Living people
Namibian cricketers
Wicket-keepers